

The Minister of Conservation is a minister in the government of New Zealand with responsibility for the Department of Conservation. The current minister is Willow-Jean Prime.

The Loder Cup awarded for conservation is presented by the minister.

List of Ministers

Key

See also
Conservation in New Zealand

References

External links
The Beehive – Minister of Conservation portfolio

Conservation
Nature conservation in New Zealand